1948 in professional wrestling describes the year's events in the world of professional wrestling.

List of notable promotions 
Only one promotion held notable shows in 1948.

Supercards and tournaments

Notable events
July 18  professional wrestling promotors Pinkie George, Orville Brown, Al Haft, Harry Light, Sam Muchnick, Don Owen, and Tony Stecher form the National Wrestling Alliance (NWA), a governing body who would be the primary influence on professional wrestling in North America until the mid-1980s.
September  Alejandro Muñoz Moreno debuts the Blue Demon wrestling persona in Mexico City. He would go on to become one of the most famous professional wrestlers in lucha libre as well as act in 26 lucha films.
Stu Hart and Al Oeming created Klondike Wrestling (later known as Stampede Wrestling).

Title changes

EMLL

NWA

Awards and honors
Luchador of the Year
Tarzán López (Mexico)

Arts and entertainment
Angelo Poffo's world record for most consecutive sit-ups (6,033) is featured on the March 3 edition of Ripley's Believe It or Not! comic strip.

Debuts
 March 31 – Blue Demon
November 24 – Tiny Mills
Date uncertain
Bronco Lubich
The Fabulous Moolah
George Scott 
Johnny Barend
Lord Athol Layton
Nelson Royal
Ray Gunkel

Births
Date of birth uncertain:
Eduardo Miguel Perez, Mexican professional wrestler
 January 8 – Bobby Jaggers, American professional wrestler (d. 2012)
 January 11 – Wajima Hiroshi, Japanese professional wrestler (d. 2018) 
January 30  Black Bart
 February 7 – Kim Duk, Japanese professional wrestler
 February 19 – Big John Studd, American professional wrestler (d. 1995)
 March 3 - Ron Fuller
 May 15 – Coloso Colosetti, Argentinian professional wrestler
 June 2 – Cynthia Peretti, American professional wrestler (d. 2009)
 June 23 – Earl Oliver, American wrestling columnist and historian
 June 29 – Leo Burke, Canadian professional wrestler
 July 11 - Ernie Holmes, American professional wrestler and footballer (died in 2008) 
 July 18 – Carlos Colón Sr., Puerto Rican professional wrestler and wrestling promoter
 July 27 – Greg Gagne, American professional wrestler
 July 28 – Bobby Bold Eagle, American wrestler
 August 6 – Dino Bravo, Canadian professional wrestler (d. 1993)
 August 8 - Dee Booher, American professional wrestler (d. 2022) 
 August 27 – Sgt. Slaughter, American professional wrestler
 September 3 - Butcher Brannigan, American professional wrestler (d. 2009) 
 September 8 – Great Kabuki, Japanese professional wrestler
 September 12:
Rocky Hata (d. 1991) 
Roberto Soto 
 September 21 – Mitsuo Momota, Japanese professional wrestler
 September 26 – Kazuo Sakurada, Japanese professional wrestler (d. 2020)
 September 29 – Jaque Mate, Mexican luchador
 October 4 – Linda McMahon, wrestling executive    
 October 15 – Savannah Jack (died in 2012) 
 November 4 - Buzz Tyler (died in 2021)
 November 12 - Goro Tsurumi (died  in 2022)
 November 28 – Smith Hart, Canadian professional wrestler (d. 2017) 
 December 21 – Ron Bass, American professional wrestler (d. 2017)
 December 28 - Izzy Slapawitz, American professional wrestler (d. 2019)

Deaths
August 16 - Babe Ruth, 53

References
General

Specific

 
professional wrestling